Judge Smith (born 1948) is an English songwriter, author, composer and performer. Judge Smith may also refer to:

Judges
Arthur Mumford Smith (1903–1968), judge of the United States Court of Customs and Patent Appeals
Caleb Blood Smith (1808–1864), judge of the United States District Court for the District of Indiana
Charles Lynwood Smith Jr. (born 1943), judge of the United States District Court for the Northern District of Alabama
Charles P. Smith (judge) (born c. 1879), judge of the United States Board of Tax Appeals, later the United States Tax Court
D. Brooks Smith (born 1951), judge of the United States Court of Appeals for the Third Circuit
Edward G. Smith (born 1961) , judge of the United States District Court for the Eastern District of Pennsylvania
Edward Samuel Smith (1919–2001), judge of the United States Court of Appeals for the Federal Circuit
Fern M. Smith (born 1933), judge of the United States District Court for the Northern District of California
George Curtis Smith (1935–2020), judge of the United States District Court for the Southern District of Ohio
Henry Augustus Middleton Smith (1853–1924), judge of the United States District Court for the District of South Carolina, and of the Eastern and Western Districts of South Carolina
Howard W. Smith (1883-1976), U.S. Representative from Virginia from 1931 to 1967, frequently known as "Judge Smith"
J. Joseph Smith (1904–1980), judge of the United States Court of Appeals for the Second Circuit
James Francis Smith (1859–1928), judge of the United States Court of Customs Appeals
Janet Smith (judge) (born 1940), British judge of the Court of Appeal
Jerry Edwin Smith (born 1946), judge of the United States Court of Appeals for the Fifth Circuit
John Lewis Smith Jr. (1912–1992), judge of the United States District Court for the District of Columbia
Lavenski Smith (born 1958), judge of the United States Court of Appeals for the Eighth Circuit
Loren A. Smith, (born 1944), judge of the United States Court of Federal Claims
Milan Smith (born 1942), judge of the United States Court of Appeals for the Ninth Circuit
N. Randy Smith (born 1949), judge of the United States Court of Appeals for the Ninth Circuit
Orma Rinehart Smith (1904–1982), judge of the United States District Court for the Northern District of Mississippi
Ortrie D. Smith (born 1946), judge of the United States District Court for the Western District of Missouri
Peter Smith (judge), Sir Peter Winston Smith (born 1952), judge of the High Court of England
Randle Jasper Smith (1908–1962), judge of the United States District Court for the Western District of Missouri
Rebecca Beach Smith (born 1949), judge of the United States District Court for the Eastern District of Virginia
Rodney Smith (judge) (born 1974), judge of the United States District Court for the Southern District of Florida
Russell Evans Smith (1908–1990), judge of the United States District Court for the District of Montana
Sidney Oslin Smith Jr. (1923–2012), judge of the United States District Court for the Northern District of Georgia
Talbot Smith (1899–1978), judge of the United States District Court for the Eastern District of Michigan
Truman Smith (1791–1884), judge of the Court of Arbitration under the treaty of 1862 with Great Britain
Walter I. Smith (1862–1922), judge of the United States Court of Appeals for the Eighth Circuit
Walter Scott Smith Jr. (born 1940), judge of the United States District Court for the Western District of Texas
William Smith (judge, born 1697) (1697–1769), judge of the Province of New York
William E. Smith (judge) (born 1959), judge of the United States District Court for the District of Rhode Island
William Francis Smith (1903–1968), judge of the United States Court of Appeals for the Third Circuit
William Robert Smith (1863–1924), judge of the United States District Court for the Western District of Texas

See also
Justice Smith (disambiguation)